Taylor Hunt (born 5 November 1990) is a former professional Australian rules footballer who played for the Geelong Football Club and Richmond Football Club in the Australian Football League.

AFL career

Geelong (2009–2014)
Hunt was selected by Geelong with the 49th pick in the 2008 AFL Draft, having previously been playing with the Sandringham Dragons in the TAC Cup.

He was named as an emergency on two occasions in 2009, but failed to make his debut that season. Hunt made his AFL debut in round 11, 2010 against the West Coast Eagles at Subiaco Oval. He also kicked a goal that was nominated for goal of the week against in that match. Hunt went on to play six more games at senior level in 2010.

In 2011 he played 13 matches at AFL level, before appearing in 21 and 15 the following two seasons. He fell out of favour by 2014 however and managed just seven matches at the top level. Hunt was de-listed by Geelong at the end of that season, having played 63 matches in his six years at the club.

Richmond (2015–2017)

He played in a career high 23 matches in 2015, while setting career bests for disposals and marks and receiving his only four career Brownlow Medal votes. Hunt played a further 17 matches in 2016 but only two in 2017.

Hunt was de-listed by Richmond at the conclusion of the 2017 season, having played 42 matches over three years at the club.

Statistics

|- style="background-color: #EAEAEA"
! scope="row" | 
|  || 38 || 0 || — || — || — || — || — || — || — || — || — || — || — || — || — || —
|-
! scope="row" | 
|  || 38 || 7 || 1 || 2 || 63 || 44 || 107 || 28 || 14 || 0.1 || 0.3 || 9.0 || 6.3 || 15.3 || 4.0 || 2.0
|- style="background-color: #EAEAEA"
! scope="row" | 
|  || 19 || 13 || 1 || 2 || 103 || 82 || 185 || 37 || 32 || 0.1 || 0.2 || 7.9 || 6.3 || 14.2 || 2.8 || 2.5
|-
! scope="row" | 
|  || 19 || 21 || 8 || 6 || 146 || 170 || 316 || 75 || 70 || 0.4 || 0.3 || 7.0 || 8.1 || 15.0 || 3.6 || 3.3 
|- style="background-color: #EAEAEA"
! scope="row" | 
|  || 19 || 15 || 6 || 3 || 98 || 96 || 194 || 37 || 43 || 0.4 || 0.2 || 6.5 || 6.4 || 12.9 || 2.5 || 2.9
|-
! scope="row" | 
|  || 19 || 7 || 3 || 1 || 58 || 35 || 93 || 21 || 32 || 0.4 || 0.1 || 8.2 || 5.0 || 13.2 || 3.0 || 4.6 
|-
|- style="background-color: #EAEAEA"
! scope="row" | 
|  || 28 || 23 || 1 || 2 || 228 || 173 || 401 || 121 || 46 || 0.0 || 0.1 || 9.9 || 7.5 || 17.4 || 5.3 || 2.0
|-
! scope="row" | 
|  || 28 || 17 || 1 || 0 || 163 || 151 || 314 || 99 || 34 || 0.1 || 0.0 || 9.6 || 8.9 || 18.5 || 5.8 || 2.0 
|- style="background-color: #EAEAEA"
! scope="row" | 
|  || 28 || 2 || 0 || 0 || 4 || 15 || 19 || 2 || 1 || 0.0 || 0.0 || 2.0 || 7.5 || 9.5 || 1.0 || 0.5
|-
|- class="sortbottom"
! colspan=3| Career
! 105
! 21
! 16
! 863			
! 766
! 1629
! 420
! 272
! 0.2
! 0.2
! 8.2			
! 7.3
! 15.5
! 4.0
! 2.6
|}

References

External links

Geelong Football Club players
Richmond Football Club players
Living people
1990 births
Australian rules footballers from Victoria (Australia)
Sandringham Dragons players